

Warren Court (1953-1968) 
 Mapp v. Ohio (1961) - pushed exclusionary rule down to states
 Terry v. Ohio (1968) - stop and frisk ok for officer safety
 Sibron v. New York (1968) - companion case to Terry
 Peters v. New York (1968) - companion case to Terry

Burger Court (1969-1986) 
 Adams v. Williams (1972) - extended from violent crimes to drug possession
  United States v. Brignoni-Ponce (1975) - not ok for immigration to stop car based solely on "mexican appearance" of occupants
 United States v. Mendenhall (1980) - "free to leave"
United States v. Cortez (1981)
 Florida v. Royer (1983) - drug courier profile
 Michigan v. Long (1983) - passenger compartment of car
 I.N.S. v. Delgado (1984) - "free to continue working"

Rehnquist Court (1986-2005) 
 Alabama v. White (1990) - anonymous tips with no indication of reliability of tip (also: Prado Navarette v. California)
 Michigan Department of State Police v. Sitz (1990) - sobriety checkpoints
 Florida v. Bostick (1991) - "as long as police do not convey a message, etc"
 Minnesota v. Dickerson (1993) - plain view doctrine - incentive to frisk
 Whren v. United States (1996) - pretextual stop
 Maryland v. Wilson (1997) - applies to passengers of car
 Illinois v. Wardlow (2000) - inference of suspicion from flight (can be extended to any evasive movement)

Roberts Court (2005-present) 
 Arizona v. Johnson (2009) - frisk passenger in lawfully stopped car

External links
Library of Congress - U.S. Reports - Supreme Court decisions:

Search and seizure case law